Tilottama is an Apsara (celestial nymph) described in Hindu mythology.

Tilottama may also refer to:

People
 Tilottama Majumdar (born 1966), Indian Bengali-speaking novelist, short story writer, poet, lyricist, and essayist
 Tilottama Rajan

Media
 Tilottama (1966 film), a 1966 Malayalam language film
 Tilottama (1951 film), a 1951 Telugu folklore film

Places
 Tilottama, Rupandehi, a town in western Nepal